Daniil Sapljoshin (born 1 January 1980 in Tallinn) is an Estonian heavyweight kickboxer.

Titles
Professional
2010 K-1 World Grand Prix 2010 in Warsaw champion
Amateur
2010 IFMA Muay Thai Riga Open winner

Kickboxing record

|-
|-  bgcolor="#FFBBBB"
| 2010-12-19 || Loss ||align=left| Turpal Tokaev || Tatneft Cup 2011 1st selection 1/8 final || Kazan, Russia || KO (Right hook) || 1 || || 26-5
|-  bgcolor="#CCFFCC"
| 2010-10-09 || Win ||align=left| Kristaps Zile || Fight Night VII || Tallinn, Estonia ||Decision (Unanimous)|| 3 ||3:00 || 26-4  
|-
|-  bgcolor="#CCFFCC"
| 2010-09-18 || Win ||align=left| Kristaps Zile || IFMA Muythai Latvia open 2010 || Riga, Latvia ||Decision (Split)|| 4 ||2:00 || 25-4
|-
|-  bgcolor="#FFBBBB"
| 2010-05-21 || Loss ||align=left| Sebastian Ciobanu || K-1 World Grand Prix 2010 in Bucharest|| Bucharest, Romania ||KO|| 1 ||0:47 || 24-4
|-
|-  bgcolor="#CCFFCC"
| 2010-03-28 || Win ||align=left| Tomasz Sarara || K-1 World Grand Prix 2010 in Warsaw || Warsaw, Poland || TKO || 1 || 1:34 || 24-3
|-
! style=background:white colspan=9 |
|-
|-  bgcolor="#CCFFCC"
| 2010-03-28 || Win ||align=left| Martynas Knyzelis || K-1 World Grand Prix 2010 in Warsaw || Warsaw, Poland || TKO || 1 ||  || 23-3
|-
|-  bgcolor="#CCFFCC"
| 2010-03-28 || Win ||align=left| Kiril Pendjurov || K-1 World Grand Prix 2010 in Warsaw || Warsaw, Poland || Decision (Split) || 3 || 3:00 || 22-3
|-
|-  bgcolor="#CCFFCC"
| 2010-02-27 || Win ||align=left| Monvids Pirsko || IFMA Muay thai Riga open 2010 || Riga, Latvia || Decision (Unanimous) || 4 || 2:00 || 21-3
|-
! style=background:white colspan=9 |
|-
|-  bgcolor="#CCFFCC"
| 2010-02-27 || Win ||align=left| Igors Levickis || IFMA Muay thai Riga open 2010 || Riga, Latvia || Decision (Unanimous) || 4 || 2:00 || 20-3
|-
|-  bgcolor="#FFBBBB"
| 2009-12-17 || Loss ||align=left| Alexander Vezhevatov || Tatneft Cup 2010 1st selection 1/8 final || Kazan, Russia || TKO (Corner stoppage) || 3 || || 19-3
|-  bgcolor="#CCFFCC"
| 2009-11-21 || Win ||align=left| Maris Timofejevs || K-1 Europe Grand Prix 2009 in Tallinn || Tallinn, Estonia || TKO || 3 || 2:06 || 19-2
|-
| colspan=9 | Legend:

Footnotes

See also 
List of K-1 events
List of K-1 champions
List of male kickboxers

References

1980 births
Estonian male kickboxers
Heavyweight kickboxers
Estonian Muay Thai practitioners
Sportspeople from Tallinn
Living people
Estonian people of Russian descent
20th-century Estonian people
21st-century Estonian people